ROKR can refer to:
The Motorola Rokr series of mobile phones, which included:
Motorola ROKR E1
Motorola ROKR E2
Motorola ROKR E6
Motorola ROKR E8
Motorola ROKR EM30
Motorola ROKR Z6
Motorola ROKR Z6m
Motorola ROKR S9-HD, a Bluetooth headset
Kerama Airport, Japan - ICAO code